"Cyclone" is a black evening dress created by grand couturier Jeanne Lanvin in 1939. It is in the collection of the Metropolitan Museum of Art (The Costume Institute).

History 
Lanvin's daughter Comtesse Jean de Polignac (née Marguerite di Pietro, also known as Marie-Blanche) wore this dress in 1939.

The dress also has a detachable pocket that could be worn around the waist on a thin belt.

Variations 
There is another version of this dress at the Kunstgewerbemuseum in Berlin, Germany, which has an identical skirt but a different bodice. Primary sources indicate that there was a pink version worn by the wife of the French ambassador to Britain, as well as another black version in the Palais Galliera in Paris, France.  The black version in Paris also has the detachable pocket.

Exhibitions 

 1940, "Exhibition of Dresses Worn by Well-known Women of Europe and America," The John Wanamaker Auditorium in New York City.
 1941, "Paris Openings, 1932–1940," at the Metropolitan Museum of Art.
 1951, "Seeds of Fashion" at the Metropolitan Museum of Art.
2002–2003, "Blithe Spirit: The Windsor Set" at the Metropolitan Museum of Art.

See also
 List of individual dresses

References 

Created via preloaddraft
Metropolitan Museum of Art 2021 drafts
Clothing of the Metropolitan Museum of Art
Individual dresses
Black dresses